Horace E. Kennedy was an American politician. He served as the 26th mayor of Lancaster, Pennsylvania from 1920 to 1922.

References

Mayors of Lancaster, Pennsylvania